The following is an overview of events in 1985 in film, including the highest-grossing films, award ceremonies and festivals, a list of films released and notable births and deaths.

Highest-grossing films (U.S.)

The top ten 1985 released films by box office gross in North America are as follows:

Context
The year was considered an unsuccessful one for film. Despite a record number of film releases, many films failed at the box office, and ticket sales were down 17% compared with 1984. Industry executives believed the problem, in part, was a lack of original concepts. Films about fantasy and magic failed, as audiences leaned towards science-fiction. Janet Maslin said the fault for this lay partly with Steven Spielberg, who had created such a successful template with films like E.T. the Extra-Terrestrial and Close Encounters of the Third Kind that many fantasy films had imitated them. There was also a saturation of youth-oriented films targeted at those under 18. Executives were not fond of these films, but the financial rewards were too significant to ignore. The few films aimed at older audiences, like Cocoon, were surprise successes. Only Back to the Future and Rambo: First Blood Part II were successful blockbusters, earning more than double the box office of Cocoon. Films offering escapism and pro-America themes like Rambo: First Blood Part II and Rocky IV had also fared well.

The glut of youth-targeted films like Return to Oz and The Black Cauldron, and science-fiction comedies like Weird Science, Real Genius, and My Science Project had resulted in a string of failures. Executives said that the films were all very similar and marketed in the same way, offering no variety for audiences.

Events
 June 5 – The Chicago Cubs play the Atlanta Braves in a baseball game at Wrigley Field. Excerpts from the broadcast later pin this date as the day featured in Ferris Bueller's Day Off.
 December 3 – Roger Moore steps down from the role of James Bond after twelve years and seven films. He is replaced by Timothy Dalton.

Awards

Palme d'Or (Cannes Film Festival):
When Father Was Away on Business (Otac na službenom putu), directed by Emir Kusturica, Yugoslavia

Golden Lion (Venice Film Festival):
Vagabond (Sans toit ni loi), directed by Agnès Varda, France / U.K.

Golden Bear (Berlin Film Festival):
Die Frau und der Fremde (The Woman and the Stranger), directed by Rainer Simon, East Germany
Wetherby, directed by David Hare, United Kingdom

Notable films released in 1985

United States unless stated

#
28 Up, a documentary film - (U.K.)

A
Adieu Bonaparte, directed by Youssef Chahine, starring Michel Piccoli - (France/Egypt)
The Adventures of Mark Twain, starring James Whitmore
After Hours, directed by Martin Scorsese, starring Griffin Dunne, Rosanna Arquette, Catherine O'Hara, Teri Garr, Linda Fiorentino, John Heard, Verna Bloom, Cheech Marin, Tommy Chong
Agnes of God, directed by Norman Jewison; starring Jane Fonda, Anne Bancroft, Meg Tilly
Alamo Bay, directed by Louis Malle, starring Ed Harris and Amy Madigan
Alice in Wonderland, TV film, starring Natalie Gregory, Sid Caesar, Carol Channing, Sammy Davis, Jr., Telly Savalas, Ringo Starr
The Alley Cat (Le Matou) - (Canada)
American Flyers, starring Kevin Costner, David Marshall Grant, Rae Dawn Chong, Alexandra Paul
American Ninja, starring Michael Dudikoff
Angry Harvest (Bittere Ernte), starring Armin Mueller-Stahl - (West Germany)
Anne of Green Gables, starring Megan Follows - (Canada)
Arjun, starring Sunny Deol and Dimple Kapadia - (India)
The Assam Garden, starring Deborah Kerr and Madhur Jaffrey - (U.K.)
Asterix Versus Caesar (Astérix et la surprise de César) - (France)
The Aviator, starring Christopher Reeve, Rosanna Arquette, Jack Warden

B
Baby: Secret of the Lost Legend, starring Sean Young, William Katt and Patrick McGoohan
Back to the Future, directed by Robert Zemeckis, starring Michael J. Fox, Christopher Lloyd, Lea Thompson, Crispin Glover, Thomas F. Wilson
Bad Medicine, starring Steve Guttenberg, Julie Hagerty and Alan Arkin
Better Off Dead, starring John Cusack
Black Arrow, starring Oliver Reed and Fernando Rey
The Black Cauldron, directed by Ted Berman and Richard Rich, with the voices of Grant Bardsley, Susan Sheridan, Freddie Jones, Nigel Hawthorne, Phil Fondacaro and John Hurt
Bliss - (Australia)
The Blue Yonder
The Boys Next Door, starring Maxwell Caulfield and Charlie Sheen
Brazil, directed by Terry Gilliam, starring Jonathan Pryce and Robert De Niro - (U.K.)
The Breakfast Club, directed by John Hughes, starring Emilio Estevez, Molly Ringwald, Judd Nelson, Ally Sheedy, Anthony Michael Hall, Paul Gleason
Brewster's Millions, starring Richard Pryor and John Candy
The Bride, starring Sting and Jennifer Beals - (UK/US)
The Burmese Harp (Biruma no tategoto), directed by Kon Ichikawa, a remake of Ichikawa's 1956 film - (Japan)
Butterfly and Flowers (Peesua lae dokmai) - (Thailand)

C
Calamari Union, directed by Aki Kaurismäki - (Finland)
Came a Hot Friday - (New Zealand)
Cat's Eye, an anthology film starring Drew Barrymore, James Woods, Alan King, Kenneth McMillan, Robert Hays
The Care Bears Movie, starring Mickey Rooney (voice) - (Canada)
Cavegirl
Chicken with Vinegar (Poulet au Vinaigre), directed by Claude Chabrol - (France)
A Chorus Line, directed by Richard Attenborough, starring Michael Douglas and Alyson Reed
Clue, starring Tim Curry, Eileen Brennan, Michael McKean, Lesley Ann Warren, Christopher Lloyd, Madeline Kahn, Martin Mull, Colleen Camp
The Coca-Cola Kid, starring Eric Roberts and Greta Scacchi
Cocoon, directed by Ron Howard, starring Don Ameche, Wilford Brimley, Hume Cronyn, Brian Dennehy, Steve Guttenberg, Barret Oliver, Maureen Stapleton, Jessica Tandy, Gwen Verdon, Tahnee Welch
Code of Silence, directed by Andrew Davis, starring Chuck Norris and Molly Hagan
Colonel Redl, directed by István Szabó, starring Klaus Maria Brandauer - (West Germany/Hungary/Austria)
The Color Purple, directed by Steven Spielberg, starring Whoopi Goldberg, Danny Glover, Margaret Avery, Adolph Caesar, Rae Dawn Chong, Oprah Winfrey
Come and See (Idi i smotri) - (U.S.S.R.)
Commando, starring Arnold Schwarzenegger, Rae Dawn Chong, Vernon Wells, Dan Hedaya, Bill Duke, David Patrick Kelly, Alyssa Milano
Compromising Positions, directed by Frank Perry, starring Susan Sarandon, Raúl Juliá, Judith Ivey, Joe Mantegna
Crime Wave - (Canada)
Crimewave, directed by Sam Raimi, starring Louise Lasser, Reed Birney, Paul L. Smith, Brion James, Sheree J. Wilson, Edward R. Pressman, Bruce Campbell

D
D.A.R.Y.L., starring Barret Oliver, Mary Beth Hurt, Michael McKean, Josef Sommer and Colleen Camp
Dance with a Stranger, directed by Mike Newell, starring Rupert Everett and Miranda Richardson - (U.K.)
Day of the Dead, directed by George A. Romero, starring Lori Cardille, Terry Alexander, Joseph Pilato, Jarlath Conroy and Richard Liberty - the final part of Romero's zombie trilogy
Death in a French Garden (Péril en la demeure) - (France)
Death of a Salesman, directed by Volker Schlöndorff, starring Dustin Hoffman and John Malkovich - (made for TV)
Death Wish 3, starring Charles Bronson
Defence of the Realm, starring Gabriel Byrne and Greta Scacchi - (U.K.)
Déjà Vu, directed by Anthony B. Richmond, starring Jaclyn Smith, Claire Bloom, Nigel Terry and Shelley Winters
Desert Hearts, starring Patricia Charbonneau, Helen Shaver, Audra Lindley
Desperately Seeking Susan, directed by Susan Seidelman, starring Rosanna Arquette, Madonna, Aidan Quinn, Laurie Metcalf
Dim Sum: A Little Bit of Heart, directed by Wayne Wang
Dissolved and Effused (Rozpuštěný a vypuštěný) - (Czechoslovakia)
Dr. Otto and the Riddle of the Gloom Beam, starring Jim Varney
Dreamchild, starring Ian Holm, Coral Browne, Peter Gallagher - (U.K.)

E
Eleni, directed by Peter Yates, starring John Malkovich, Kate Nelligan, Linda Hunt, Glenne Headly
The Emerald Forest, directed by John Boorman, starring Powers Boothe, Meg Foster, Charley Boorman - (U.K.)
Enemy Mine, directed by Wolfgang Petersen, starring Dennis Quaid and Louis Gossett Jr. - (West Germany/United States)
Eoudong (Courtesan) - (South Korea)
Ewoks: The Battle for Endor, starring Wilford Brimley and Warwick Davis
Explorers, directed by Joe Dante, starring Ethan Hawke, River Phoenix and Jason Presson

F
The Falcon and the Snowman, directed by John Schlesinger, starring Timothy Hutton and Sean Penn
Family Life (La Vie de Famille) - (France)
Fandango, starring Kevin Costner and Judd Nelson
Festa di laurea (Graduation Party) - (Italy)
Fever Pitch, directed by Richard Brooks, starring Ryan O'Neal, Giancarlo Giannini, Chad Everett, Catherine Hicks
Final Justice, starring Joe Don Baker
Fire Festival (Himatsuri) - (Japan)
Flesh and Blood, directed by Paul Verhoeven, starring Rutger Hauer and Jennifer Jason Leigh - (United States/Netherlands/Spain)
Fletch, starring Chevy Chase
Fool for Love, directed by Robert Altman, starring Sam Shepard and Kim Basinger
Fran - (Australia)
Friday the 13th, Part V: A New Beginning, directed by Danny Steinmann, starring Melanie Kinnaman and John Shepherd
Fright Night, starring William Ragsdale, Chris Sarandon, Roddy McDowall, Amanda Bearse

G
Ghoulies, starring Peter Liapis, Lisa Pelikan, Michael Des Barres, Scott Thompson
Ghulami, starring Dharmendra and Naseeruddin Shah - (India)
Girls Just Want to Have Fun, starring Sarah Jessica Parker and Helen Hunt
Give the Devil His Due (S čerty nejsou žerty) - (Czechoslovakia)
Goodbye, New York, starring Julie Hagerty
The Goonies, directed by Richard Donner, starring Sean Astin, Josh Brolin, Jeff Cohen, Corey Feldman, Kerri Green, Ke Huy Quan, Martha Plimpton
Gotcha!, starring Anthony Edwards and Linda Fiorentino
Grace Quigley, starring Katharine Hepburn and Nick Nolte
La Gran Fiesta - (Puerto Rico)
Guest from the Future (Gostya iz budushchego) - (U.S.S.R.)
Gymkata, starring Kurt Thomas, Tetchie Agbayani, Richard Norton

H
Hail Mary (Je vous salue, Marie), directed by Jean-Luc Godard - (France)
Half Life: A Parable for the Nuclear Age - (Australia)
Heaven Help Us, starring Andrew McCarthy and Mary Stuart Masterson
Here Come the Littles - (United States/Canada/Japan/Luxembourg)
The Holcroft Covenant, starring Michael Caine, Anthony Andrews, Victoria Tennant, Lilli Palmer
The Home and the World (Ghare Baire), directed by Satyajit Ray - (India)
Hour of the Star (A Hora da Estrela) - (Brazil)
How Poets are Losing Their Illusions (Jak básníci přicházejí o iluze) - (Czechoslovakia)

I
De IJssalon (The Ice-Cream Parlor) - (Netherlands)
Insignificance, directed by Nicolas Roeg, starring Theresa Russell, Tony Curtis, Gary Busey - (U.K.)
Into the Night, starring Jeff Goldblum and Michelle Pfeiffer
Invasion U.S.A., starring Chuck Norris

J
Jagged Edge, directed by Richard Marquand, starring Glenn Close, Jeff Bridges, Robert Loggia, Peter Coyote
The Jewel of the Nile, directed by Lewis Teague, starring Michael Douglas, Kathleen Turner, Danny DeVito
Joshua Then and Now, starring James Woods and Alan Arkin - (Canada)
The Journey of Natty Gann, starring Meredith Salenger and John Cusack
Just One of the Guys, starring Joyce Hyser

K
King David, starring Richard Gere - (UK/US)
King Solomon's Mines, starring Richard Chamberlain and Sharon Stone
Kiss of the Spider Woman (O Beijo da Mulher Aranha), directed by Héctor Babenco, starring William Hurt, Raúl Juliá, Sônia Braga - (Brazil/United States)
Krush Groove, starring Blair Underwood, Run–D.M.C., Sheila E.

L
Ladyhawke, starring Matthew Broderick, Michelle Pfeiffer and Rutger Hauer
The Last Dragon, starring Taimak, Faith Prince
The Last Polka, starring John Candy and Eugene Levy - (Canada)
Latino, directed by Haskell Wexler
Leave All Fair, starring John Gielgud and Jane Birkin (New Zealand/France)
Legend, directed by Ridley Scott, starring Tom Cruise, Mia Sara, Tim Curry - (UK/US)
The Legend of Billie Jean, starring Helen Slater, Keith Gordon, Peter Coyote, Christian Slater, Yeardley Smith
The Legend of Suram Fortress, directed by Sergei Parajanov (Soviet Union)
Letter to Brezhnev, starring Peter Firth and Alexandra Pigg - (U.K.)
Lifeforce, starring Steve Railsback, Mathilda May, Peter Firth, Frank Finlay and Patrick Stewart, directed by Tobe Hooper
Lonely Heart (Sabishinbou) - (Japan)
Lost in America, directed by and starring Albert Brooks, with Julie Hagerty
Lust in the Dust, directed by Paul Bartel, starring Divine, Tab Hunter, Lainie Kazan

M
Mad Max Beyond Thunderdome, starring Mel Gibson and Tina Turner - (Australia)
The Man with One Red Shoe, starring Tom Hanks, Carrie Fisher, Lori Singer, Dabney Coleman
Manevri na petiya etazh (Maneuvers on the Fifth Floor) - (Bulgaria)
Marie, starring Sissy Spacek, Jeff Daniels, Fred Dalton Thompson
Mask, directed by Peter Bogdanovich, starring Eric Stoltz, Cher and Sam Elliott
Mask of Murder, starring Rod Taylor and Valerie Perrine - (United States/Sweden)
The Mass Is Ended (La messa è finita), directed by and starring Nanni Moretti - (Italy)
Maxie, starring Glenn Close, Mandy Patinkin, Ruth Gordon, Valerie Curtin
The Mean Season, starring Kurt Russell, Mariel Hemingway and Richard Jordan
Meri Jung, starring Anil Kapoor - (India)
The Midnight Hour
Mirch Masala (Spices), starring Naseeruddin Shah, Smita Patil, Om Puri - (U.K./India)
Mishima: A Life in Four Chapters, directed by Paul Schrader, starring Ken Ogata - (United States/Japan)
Movers & Shakers, directed by William Asher, starring Walter Matthau, Charles Grodin, Gilda Radner
Mr. Vampire (Goeng-si Sin-sang) - (Hong Kong)
Murphy's Romance, directed by Martin Ritt, starring Sally Field, James Garner, Brian Kerwin, Corey Haim
My Beautiful Laundrette, directed by Stephen Frears, starring Daniel Day-Lewis and Gordon Warnecke - (U.K.)
My Life as a Dog (Mitt liv som hund), directed by Lasse Hallström - (Sweden) - Golden Globe Award for Best Foreign Language Film
My Science Project
My Sweet Little Village (Vesničko má středisková), directed by Jiří Menzel - (Czechoslovakia)

N
National Lampoon's European Vacation, starring Chevy Chase and Beverly D'Angelo
A Nightmare on Elm Street 2: Freddy's Revenge
No End (Bez końca), directed by Krzysztof Kieślowski - (Poland)
No Surrender, starring Michael Angelis and Bernard Hill - (U.K.)
Nothing Left to Do But Cry (Non ci resta che piangere), directed by and starring Roberto Benigni and Massimo Troisi - (Italy)

O
The Official Story - (Argentina) - Academy and Golden Globe Awards for Best Foreign Language Film
Once Bitten, starring Lauren Hutton and Jim Carrey (in his first major role)
One Magic Christmas, starring Mary Steenburgen and Harry Dean Stanton - (United States/Canada)
Ordeal by Innocence, starring Donald Sutherland, Faye Dunaway, Christopher Plummer - (U.K.)
Out of Africa, directed by Sydney Pollack, starring Meryl Streep, Robert Redford, Klaus Maria Brandauer - Academy and Golden Globe (drama) Awards

P
Padre nuestro (Our Father), starring Victoria Abril - (Spain)
Pale Rider, directed by and starring Clint Eastwood, with Michael Moriarty and Carrie Snodgress
Pas în doi (Passo Doble) - (Romania)
The Peanut Butter Solution - (Canada)
Pee-wee's Big Adventure, directed by Tim Burton, starring Paul Reubens
Perfect, directed by James Bridges, starring John Travolta and Jamie Lee Curtis
Phenomena, directed by Dario Argento - (Italy)
Pizza Connection, directed by Damiano Damiani - (Italy)
Plenty, directed by Fred Schepisi, starring Meryl Streep, Sam Neill, Charles Dance, Tracey Ullman, Ian McKellen, Sting - (U.K.)
Police, starring Gérard Depardieu and Sophie Marceau - (France)
Police Academy 2: Their First Assignment, starring Steve Guttenberg, George Gaynes, Colleen Camp, Bubba Smith
Police Story (Ging chat goo si), directed by and starring Jackie Chan - (Hong Kong)
Private Resort, starring Johnny Depp, Rob Morrow, Andrew Dice Clay
Prizzi's Honor, directed by John Huston, starring Jack Nicholson, Kathleen Turner, Anjelica Huston, Robert Loggia, William Hickey - Golden Globe for Best Picture (Musical or Comedy)
The Protector, starring Jackie Chan and Danny Aiello - (Hong Kong/United States)
The Purple Rose of Cairo, directed by Woody Allen, starring Mia Farrow, Jeff Daniels, Danny Aiello

Q
The Quiet Earth - (New Zealand)

R
Radioactive Dreams, starring Michael Dudikoff and Lisa Blount - (United States/Mexico)
Rainbow Brite and the Star Stealer - (United States/Japan)
Rambo: First Blood Part II, starring Sylvester Stallone, Richard Crenna, Charles Napier, Julia Nickson
Ran, directed by Akira Kurosawa, starring Tatsuya Nakadai and Mieko Harada - (Japan)
Re-Animator, starring Jeffrey Combs
Real Genius, starring Val Kilmer, Gabe Jarret, William Atherton and Michelle Meyrink
Red Kiss (Rouge Baiser) - (France)
Red Sonja, starring Brigitte Nielsen, Arnold Schwarzenegger, Sandahl Bergman
Remo Williams: The Adventure Begins, starring Fred Ward, Kate Mulgrew, Joel Grey
Rendez-vous, starring Juliette Binoche and Jean-Louis Trintignant - (France)
Restless Natives, directed by Michael Hoffman - (U.K.)
The Return of the Living Dead, directed by Dan O'Bannon
Return to Oz, starring Fairuza Balk, Piper Laurie, Jean Marsh
Revolution, directed by Hugh Hudson, starring Al Pacino, Donald Sutherland, Nastassja Kinski - (U.K.)
Rocky IV, directed by and starring Sylvester Stallone, with Talia Shire, Dolph Lundgren, Carl Weathers, Brigitte Nielsen, Burt Young
A Room with a View, directed by James Ivory, starring Maggie Smith and Helena Bonham Carter - (U.K.)
Runaway Train, directed by Andrei Konchalovsky, starring Jon Voight, Eric Roberts, Rebecca De Mornay
The Runner (Davandeh) - (Iran)
Rustlers' Rhapsody, directed by Hugh Wilson, starring Tom Berenger, Marilu Henner, Sela Ward, Andy Griffith, Patrick Wayne

S
Santa Claus: The Movie, starring Dudley Moore - (UK/US)
Scorpio Nights - (Philippines)
Secret Admirer, starring C. Thomas Howell, Lori Loughlin, Kelly Preston, Fred Ward
The Secret of the Sword
Sesame Street Presents: Follow That Bird
Shaker Run, starring Cliff Robertson, Leif Garrett, Lisa Harrow
Shoah - (France)
The Shooting Party, starring James Mason and John Gielgud - (U.K.)
Silver Bullet, starring Gary Busey, Corey Haim, Megan Follows, Everett McGill
Silverado, directed by Lawrence Kasdan, starring Kevin Kline, Scott Glenn, Danny Glover, Kevin Costner, Jeff Goldblum, Brian Dennehy, John Cleese, Rosanna Arquette, Linda Hunt
A Simple Death (Prostaya smert) - (U.S.S.R.)
The Slugger's Wife, directed by Hal Ashby, starring Michael O'Keefe and Rebecca De Mornay
Smooth Talk, starring Laura Dern and Treat Williams
Spies Like Us, starring Dan Aykroyd and Chevy Chase
St. Elmo's Fire, directed by Joel Schumacher, starring Emilio Estevez, Rob Lowe, Andrew McCarthy, Demi Moore, Judd Nelson, Ally Sheedy, Mare Winningham, Andie MacDowell, Martin Balsam, Jenny Wright, Joyce Van Patten
Starchaser: The Legend of Orin
Stick, directed by and starring Burt Reynolds, with Candice Bergen, Charles Durning, George Segal
Subway, directed by Luc Besson, starring Isabelle Adjani and Christopher Lambert - (France)
Summer Rental, directed by Carl Reiner, starring John Candy, Rip Torn, Richard Crenna
The Supergrass, starring Adrian Edmondson, Jennifer Saunders, Robbie Coltrane - (U.K.)
The Sure Thing, directed by Rob Reiner, starring John Cusack, Daphne Zuniga, Nicollette Sheridan, Viveca Lindfors, Anthony Edwards
Sweet Dreams, a biopic of Patsy Cline, starring Jessica Lange and Ed Harris

T
Taipei Story (Qing mei zhu ma) - (Taiwan)
Tampopo (Dandelion) - (Japan)
Target, starring Gene Hackman and Matt Dillon
Tea in the Harem (Le Thé au harem d'Archimède) - (France)
Teen Wolf, starring Michael J. Fox
That Was Then... This Is Now, starring Emilio Estevez, Craig Sheffer
That's Dancing!, featuring Gene Kelly, Liza Minnelli, Mikhail Baryshnikov, Sammy Davis, Jr. and others
Thirteen at Dinner, starring Peter Ustinov, Faye Dunaway, Lee Horsley, Bill Nighy
Three Men and a Cradle (Trois hommes et un couffin) - (France)
The Time of the Hero (a.k.a. La ciudad y los perros) - (Peru)
The Time to Live and the Time to Die (Tong nian wang shi) - (Taiwan)
To Live and Die in L.A., directed by William Friedkin, starring William Petersen and Willem Dafoe
Trancers
Transylvania 6-5000, starring Jeff Goldblum, Ed Begley, Jr., Joseph Bologna, Teresa Ganzel, Geena Davis
Treasure Island (L'île au trésor) - (France/Chile)
The Trip to Bountiful, starring Geraldine Page, John Heard, Rebecca De Mornay
Trouble in Mind, directed by Alan Rudolph, starring Kris Kristofferson, Lori Singer, Geneviève Bujold, Keith Carradine
Tuff Turf, starring James Spader
Turk 182!, starring Timothy Hutton, Robert Urich, Kim Cattrall
Turtle Diary, starring Glenda Jackson and Ben Kingsley - (U.K.)
Twice in a Lifetime, starring Gene Hackman, Ellen Burstyn, Ann-Margret, Amy Madigan, Ally Sheedy, Brian Dennehy
The Two Lives of Mattia Pascal (Le due vite di Mattia Pascal), starring Marcello Mastroianni and Senta Berger - (Italy)

U
UFOria, starring Fred Ward, Harry Dean Stanton, Cindy Williams
The Unknown Soldier (Tuntematon sotilas) - (Finland)

V
Vagabond (Sans toit ni loi), directed by Agnès Varda - (France) - Golden Lion award
Vampire Hunter D (Kyûketsuki hantâ D) - (Japan)
Vampires in Havana (¡Vampiros en La Habana!) - (Cuba)
La vaquilla (The Heifer), directed by Luis García Berlanga - (Spain)
A View to a Kill, starring Roger Moore (as James Bond) with Christopher Walken, Tanya Roberts, Grace Jones - (U.K.)
Vision Quest, starring Matthew Modine and Linda Fiorentino
Volunteers, starring Tom Hanks, John Candy, Rita Wilson, Tim Thomerson, George Plimpton

W
Walking the Edge, starring Robert Forster and Nancy Kwan
Water, starring Michael Caine, Billy Connolly, Valerie Perrine - (U.K.)
Wetherby, directed by David Hare, starring Vanessa Redgrave and Ian Holm - (U.K.) - Golden Bear award
Weird Science, directed by John Hughes, starring Kelly Le Brock, Anthony Michael Hall, Ilan Mitchell-Smith, Bill Paxton
Wild Geese II, starring Scott Glenn, Barbara Carrera, Edward Fox, Laurence Olivier - (U.K.)
When Father Was Away on Business (Otac na službenom putu) - (Yugoslavia) - Palme d'Or award
White Nights, directed by Taylor Hackford, starring Mikhail Baryshnikov, Gregory Hines, Helen Mirren
Witness, directed by Peter Weir, starring Harrison Ford, Kelly McGillis, Lukas Haas
The Woman and the Stranger (Die Frau und der Fremde) - (East Germany) - Golden Bear award

Y
Year of the Dragon, directed by Michael Cimino, starring Mickey Rourke and John Lone
Yes, Madam (Huang jia shi jie), starring Michelle Yeoh and Cynthia Rothrock - (Hong Kong)
Young Sherlock Holmes (American film shot in England), directed by Barry Levinson, starring Nicholas Rowe as Holmes, Alan Cox as Watson, and Anthony Higgins

Z
A Zed & Two Noughts, directed by Peter Greenaway - (U.K.)

1985 Wide-release films in the U.S.

January–March

April–June

July–September

October–December

Births
 January 1 - Juliana Harkavy, American actress
 January 2 - Carla Juri, Swiss actress
 January 3
Nicole Beharie, American actress
Leah Gibson, Canadian actress
 January 5 - Michael Cuccione, Canadian child actor, singer and dancer (died 2001)
 January 10 - Alex Meraz, American actor and dancer
 January 11 – Aja Naomi King, American actress
January 12 - Issa Rae, American actress, writer and producer
January 13 - Ellen Wong, Canadian actress
 January 16 – Sidharth Malhotra, Indian actor
 January 19 - Damien Chazelle, American film director
 January 23 - Doutzen Kroes, Dutch actress and model
 January 25
Claudia Kim, South Korean actress and model
Hartley Sawyer, American actor
Michael Trevino, American actor
 January 28 - Tom Hopper, British actor
 January 29 - Isabel Lucas, Australian actress and model
 February 5 - Paige Howard, American actress
 February 6 - Crystal Reed, American actress
 February 7
Tina Majorino, American actress
Deborah Ann Woll, American actress and model
 February 9
David Gallagher, American actor and singer
Rachel Melvin, American actress
 February 14 - Jake Lacy, American actor
 February 15 - Natalie Morales (actress), American actress and director
 February 19
Haylie Duff, American actress and singer
Arielle Kebbel, American actress and model
 March 1 - Michael Conner Humphreys, American actor
 March 3 - Nathalie Kelley, Australian actress
 March 9 - Jolyon Coy, English actor and writer
 March 10 - Cooper Andrews, American actor
 March 13 - Emile Hirsch, American actor
 March 15
Eva Amurri, American actress
Kellan Lutz, American actor
 March 18 - Bianca King, Filipino-British former actress and model
 March 21 - Sonequa Martin-Green, American actress and producer
 March 22 - Katie Stuart, Canadian actress and stunt performer
 March 23
Maryana Spivak, Russian actress
 March 26
Jonathan Groff, American actor and singer
Keira Knightley, English actress
Francesca Marie Smith, American actress and writer
 March 27 – Ram Charan, Indian film actor
 March 31 - Jessica Szohr, American actress
 April 7 - Ariela Massotti, Brazilian actress
 April 9 - Tomohisa Yamashita, Japanese singer, actor and television host
 April 10
Barkhad Abdi, Somali-American actor and director
Christie Laing, Canadian actress
 April 12 - Hitomi Yoshizawa, Japanese former singer and actress
 April 16 
Rhiana Griffith, Australian actress
Benjamin Rojas, Argentine actor and singer
Gregor Schmidinger, Austrian screenwriter and director
 April 17
Rooney Mara, American actress
Luke Mitchell, Australian actor and model
Maiken Pius, Estonian actress 
 April 20 - Billy Magnussen, American actor
 April 22 - Kristin Fairlie, Canadian actress
 April 23 - Rachel Skarsten, Canadian actress
 April 27 - Sheila Vand, American actress
 April 30 - Gal Gadot, Israeli actress and model
 May 3 - Meagan Tandy, American actress and model
 May 5
Clark Duke, American actor, comedian and director
Shoko Nakagawa, Japanese actress, voice actress and singer
 May 9 - Chris Zylka, American actor and model
 May 10 - Odette Annable, American actress
 May 11 - Jadyn Wong, Canadian actress
 May 14
Lina Esco, American actress, producer and director
Sally Martin, New Zealand actress
 May 15 - Tathagata Mukherjee, Indian actor
 May 16
Stanislav Ianevski, Bulgarian actor
Andrew Keenan-Bolger, American actor
Julia Voth, Canadian actress and model
 May 17 - Sophie McShera, English actress
 May 22 - Tao Okamoto, Japanese actress and model
 May 25
Luciana Abreu, Portuguese singer, actress and television host
Lauren Frost, American actress and singer
 May 28 - Carey Mulligan, English actress
 May 29
Blake Foster, American actor
Yukihiro Takiguchi, Japanese actor, singer and model (died 2019)
 May 30 - Sam Gifaldi, American actor
 May 31 - Zoraida Gómez, Mexican actress
 June 2 - Miyuki Sawashiro, Japanese voice actress
 June 4 - Bar Refaeli, Israeli model, television host and actress
 June 7 - Adam Nagaitis, British actor
 June 9 – Sonam Kapoor, Indian actress and model
 June 10 - Andrew Lees (actor), Australian actor
 June 12 
 Dave Franco, American actor
 Liisa Pulk, Estonian actress
 June 16 - Débora Nascimento, Brazilian actress and model
 June 18
Sorel Carradine, American actress
Alex Hirsch, American voice actor, animator, writer, storyboard artist and producer
 June 21 - Lana Del Rey, American singer and songwriter
 June 22 - Douglas Smith (actor), Canadian actor
 June 30
Lasarus Ratuere, Australian actor
Hugh Sheridan, Australian actor, musician and television presenter
 July 1 - Léa Seydoux, French actress
 July 2
Nelson Franklin, American actor
Ashley Tisdale, American actress and singer
 July 5
François Arnaud (actor), Canadian actor
Stephanie McIntosh, Australian actress and singer
 July 6 - Ranveer Singh, Indian actor
 July 7 - Seo Woo, South Korean actress
 July 11 - Nitya Vidyasagar, Indian-American actress
 July 14
Lee Kwang-soo, South Korean actor, entertainer and model
Phoebe Waller-Bridge, English actress and writer
 July 15
Tomer Capone, Israeli actor
Pedro Carvalho (actor), Portuguese actor
Agniya Kuznetsova, Russian actress
Crowd Lu, Taiwanese singer-songwriter and actor
Ecstasia Sanders, American-Canadian actress
 July 16
Yōko Hikasa, Japanese voice actress and singer
Hiroyuki Onoue, Japanese actor
Rosa Salazar, Canadian-American actress
Cha Ye-ryun, South Korean actress
 July 17 - Caitlin Van Zandt, American actor
 July 18 
 Chace Crawford, American actor
 James Norton, English actor
 July 20 - John Francis Daley, American actor, director, producer, screenwriter and musician
 July 21 - Vanessa Lengies, Canadian actress and singer
 July 22 - Blake Harrison, English actor, voice actor and dancer
 July 25
James Lafferty, American actor, director and producer
Shantel VanSanten, American model and actress
 July 27
Aljin Abella, Australian actor of Filipino descent
Lou Taylor, American actor
 July 30 - Aml Ameen, British actor
 August 1 - Henry Lloyd-Hughes, English actor
 August 2 - Georgina Haig, Australian actress
 August 9 - Anna Kendrick, American actress and singer
 August 10 - Jared Nathan, American actor (died 2006)
 August 11 - Jacqueline Fernandez, Sri Lankan actress
 August 12 - África Zavala, Mexican actress
 August 15 - Emily Kinney, American actress, singer and songwriter
 August 16
Arden Cho, American actress, singer and model
Cristin Milioti, American actress and singer
 August 17 - Yū Aoi, Japanese actress
 August 18 - Desiree Casado, former actress
 August 21 - Laura Haddock, English actress
 August 23 - Juss Haasma, Estonian actor
 August 27 - Kayla Ewell, American actress
 September 2 - Yani Gellman, Canadian actor
 September 4 - Morgan Garrett, American voice actress
 September 6 - Lauren Lapkus, American actress and comedian
 September 10 
 Monica Lopera, Colombian-American actress
 Elyse Levesque, Canadian actress
 September 16 - Madeline Zima, American actress
 September 21 - Robert Hoffman (actor), American actor
 September 22 - Tatiana Maslany, Canadian actress
 September 24 - Jessica Lucas, Canadian actress and singer
 September 26 - Talulah Riley, English actress
 September 27 - Grace Helbig, American actress, comedian and YouTuber
 September 30 - Ben Lewis (Canadian actor), Canadian actor and writer
 October 1 - Emerald Fennell, English screen actress and director
 October 5 - Carolina Bartczak, Canadian-Polish actress
 October 11 - Michelle Trachtenberg, American actress
 October 17 - Max Irons, English-Irish actor and model
 October 24 - Tim Pocock, Australian actor
 October 25 - John Robinson (American actor), American actor
 October 26
Qi Wei, Chinese actress
Asin Thottumkal, Indian actress
 October 28 - Troian Bellisario, American actress
 October 31 - Kether Donohue, American actress and singer
 November 2 - Josh Grelle, American voice actor
 November 5 - Annet Mahendru, Afghan-born American actress of Indian-Russian descent
 November 7 - Lucas Neff, American actor
 November 10 - Giovonnie Samuels, American actress
 November 15 - Thue Ersted Rasmussen, Danish actor
 November 20 - Dan Byrd, American actor
 November 21 - Ronny Chieng, Malaysian comedian and actor
 November 23 - Katie Crown, Canadian-American actress, voice actress, comedian and writer
 November 27 - Alison Pill, Canadian actress
 November 30 
Gia Crovatin, American actress and producer
Kaley Cuoco, American actress
Chrissy Teigen, American actress, model and television personality
 December 1 - Janelle Monáe, American singer, rapper and actress
 December 3 - Amanda Seyfried, American actress and singer
 December 5 - Frankie Muniz, American actor
 December 6 - Max Kasch, American actor and musician
 December 10 - Raven-Symoné, American actress and singer

Deaths

Film debuts
Joan Allen - Compromising Positions
Kelly Asbury (animator) - The Black Cauldron
Sean Astin - The Goonies
Fairuza Balk - Return to Oz
Randall Batinkoff -  Streetwalkin'
Jason Beghe - Compromising Positions
Josh Brolin - The Goonies
Tim Burton (director) - Pee Wee's Big Adventure
Helena Bonham Carter - A Room with a View
Steve Buscemi – The Way It Is
Don Cheadle - Moving Violations
Blake Clark - St. Elmo's Fire
Gary Cole - To Live and Die in L.A.
Patrick Dempsey - Heaven Help Us
Kevin Dillon - Heaven Help Us
Charles S. Dutton - Cat's Eye
Jeff Fahey - Silverado
Linda Fiorentino - Vision Quest
Whoopi Goldberg - The Color Purple
LisaGay Hamilton - Krush Groove
Mariska Hargitay - Ghoulies
Ethan Hawke - Explorers
John Hawkes - Future-Kill
Lauren Holly - Seven Minutes in Heaven
Jan Hooks - Pee Wee's Big Adventure
Richard Jenkins - Silverado
Elias Koteas - One Magic Christmas
LL Cool J - Krush Groove
Stephen Lang - Twice in a Lifetime
Hugh Laurie - Plenty
Joey Lawrence - Summer Rental
John Leguizamo - Mixed Blood
Melissa Leo - Always
Tom Lister, Jr. - Runaway Train
Dolph Lundgren - A View to a Kill
Madonna - Vision Quest
Lesley Manville - Dance with a Stranger
Jack McGee - Turk 182
Rob Morrow - Private Resort
Viggo Mortensen - Witness
Brigitte Nielsen - Red Sonja
Danny Nucci - Explorers
Carl Anthony Payne II - The Last Dragon
River Phoenix - Explorers
Keanu Reeves - One Step Away
Miranda Richardson - Dance with a Stranger
Chris Rock - Krush Groove
Mia Sara - Legend
Jennifer Saunders - The Supergrass
Kyra Sedgwick - War and Love
Christian Slater - The Legend of Billie Jean
Yeardley Smith - Heaven Help Us
Fred Thompson - Marie
Danny Trejo - Runaway Train
Stanley Tucci - Prizzi's Honor
Blair Underwood - Krush Groove
Thomas F. Wilson - Back to the Future
Oprah Winfrey - The Color Purple
Noah Wyle - Lust in the Dust
Billy Zane - Back to the Future

See also
 List of American films of 1985
 List of British films of 1985
 List of French films of 1985
 List of German films of the 1980s
 List of Bollywood films of 1985
 List of Italian films of 1985
 List of Japanese films of 1985
 List of Swedish films of the 1980s

References

 
Film by year